Mallee Highway (formerly Ouyen Highway in Victoria) is a highway in south-eastern South Australia and north-western Victoria, running mostly across the Mallee plains. It forms part of the shortest route between Adelaide and Sydney.

Route
Mallee Highway begins at the intersection with Dukes Highway just south-east of Tailem Bend in South Australia and runs east as a dual-lane, single-carriageway road, through cereal-growing farmland at the southern end of the Murray Mallee to Pinnaroo near the border with Victoria, where it crosses the Ngarkat and Browns Well Highways. It continues east into Victoria through Ouyen, where it crosses the Calder Highway, via Manangatang and eventually to Piangil, where it meets with the Murray Valley Highway, then along Tooleybuc Road two kilometres to the north where it continues east until it meets the New South Wales border and the Murray River at Tooleybuc, where the highway officially ends; the road continues through New South Wales eventually to meet the Sturt Highway at Balranald.

History
The passing of the Highways and Vehicles Act of 1924 through the Parliament of Victoria provided for the declaration of State Highways, roads two-thirds financed by the State government through the Country Roads Board (later VicRoads). The Ouyen Highway was declared a State Highway within Victoria in the 1947/48 financial year, from the Calder Highway at Ouyen via Murrayville to the South Australian border (for a total of 81 miles); before this declaration, the roads were referred to as Ouyen-Pinnaroo Road. With the passing of the Transport Act of 1983 (itself an evolution from the original Highways and Vehicles Act of 1924), the name was later changed to the Mallee Highway and extended east along the former Ouyen-Piangil Road and Tooleybuc Road to Piangil in December 1990.

The highway was signed as National Route 12 between Tailem Bend and Ouyen in 1955, later extended with the road to Piangil in 1990. With both states' conversion to their newer alphanumeric systems in the late 1990s, its former route number was updated to B12 in 1997 (within Victoria) and in 1998 (in South Australia).

The passing of the Road Management Act 2004 granted the responsibility of overall management and development of Victoria's major arterial roads to VicRoads: in 2004, VicRoads re-declared the road as Mallee Highway (Arterial #6650), beginning at the South Australian border at Panitya and ending at the New South Wales border in Piangil.

Major intersections and towns

See also

 Highways in Australia
 Highways in Victoria
 List of highways in New South Wales
 List of highways in South Australia

References

External links

Highways in Australia
Highways in South Australia
Highways in Victoria (Australia)
Mallee (Victoria)